The 1931 All-Big Six Conference football team consists of American football players chosen by various organizations for All-Big Six Conference teams for the 1931 college football season.  The selectors for the 1931 season included the Associated Press (AP).

All-Big Six selections

Ends
 Henry Cronkite, Kansas State (AP-1)
 Harold Templeton, Iowa State (AP-2)

Tackles
 Hugh Rhea, Nebraska (AP-1)
 Otto Rost, Kansas (AP-1)
 James Gilbert, Nebraska (AP-2)
 Kenneth Kerby, Missouri (AP-2)

Guards
 George Koster, Nebraska (AP-1)
 Adolph Hraba, Kansas State (AP-1)
 Charles Teel, Oklahoma (AP-2)
 Walter Zeckser, Kansas State (AP-2)

Centers
 Paul Young, Oklahoma (AP-1)
 Lawrence Ely, Nebraska (AP-2)

Quarterbacks
 Charles Schiele, Missouri (AP-1)
 Roger Bowen, Iowa State (AP-2)

Halfbacks
 Elden Auker, Kansas State (AP-1)
 Ralph Graham, Kansas State (AP-1)
 Everett Kreizinger, Nebraska (AP-2)
 George M. Stuber, Jr. Missouri (AP-2)

Fullbacks
 George Sauer, Nebraska (AP-1)
 Carnie Smith, Kansas (AP-2)

Key
AP = Associated Press

See also
 1931 College Football All-America Team

References

All-Big Six Conference football team
All-Big Eight Conference football teams